Rome is a ghost town in South Bloomfield Township, Morrow County, in the U.S. state of Ohio.

History
Rome was laid out in 1827 by Lemuel Potter. The town failed to meet Potter's expectations, as one 19th-century writer remarks "it did not bear any resemblance to ancient Rome".

References

Geography of Morrow County, Ohio
1827 establishments in Ohio
Populated places established in 1827
Ghost towns in Ohio